Arun Homraruen (born 18 January 1970) is a Thai windsurfer. He competed at the 1996 Summer Olympics, the 2000 Summer Olympics, and the 2004 Summer Olympics.

References

External links
 
 

1970 births
Living people
Arun Homraruen
Arun Homraruen
Arun Homraruen
Sailors at the 1996 Summer Olympics – Mistral One Design
Sailors at the 2000 Summer Olympics – Mistral One Design
Sailors at the 2004 Summer Olympics – Mistral One Design
Arun Homraruen
Arun Homraruen
Arun Homraruen
Asian Games medalists in sailing
Sailors at the 1994 Asian Games
Sailors at the 1998 Asian Games
Sailors at the 2002 Asian Games
Sailors at the 2006 Asian Games
Medalists at the 1994 Asian Games
Medalists at the 1998 Asian Games
Medalists at the 2002 Asian Games
Medalists at the 2006 Asian Games
Place of birth missing (living people)
Arun Homraruen